The following is a list of the national television and radio networks and announcers who have covered the Major League Baseball Wild Card Games throughout the years. It does not include any announcers who may have appeared on local radio broadcasts produced by the participating teams.

Television

2020s

Wild Card Series

Wild Card Game

Notes
 For the 2021 AL game, ESPN2 aired an alternate "Statcast Edition" broadcast featuring Jason Benetti on play-by-play and analysis from Eduardo Pérez and MLB.com writer Mike Petriello.

2020 Wild Card Series

Notes
ABC was scheduled to air at least four of the 24 possible daytime games in the 2020 season's one-time only expanded eight-series wild card round, that the networks of ESPN will air. Not only did this mean that ABC would be airing Major League Baseball games of any kind since Game 5 of the 1995 World Series, but it would mark the first time since NBC's final game in 2000, that a Major League Baseball game had aired on any broadcast network other than Fox. The first game to definitely air on ABC on September 29, would be the #6 seed Houston Astros against the #3 Minnesota Twins from Target Field in Minneapolis. The following day, ABC would air the #6 Miami Marlins against the #3 Chicago Cubs from Wrigley Field in Chicago. Karl Ravech provided play-by-play commentary for the Houston-Minnesota game with analysts Eduardo Pérez and Tim Kurkjian. Meanwhile, Jon Sciambi, Chipper Jones, and Jesse Rogers called the Miami-Chicago Cubs game on September 30. ESPN also planned on utilizing ABC afternoon window on Friday (October 2). On October 2, ABC cut away from their broadcast Miami-Chicago Cubs game during the top of the 9th inning to deliver a special report on U.S. president Donald Trump being taken to Walter Reed National Military Medical Center for COVID-19 treatment. The conclusion of the game was shifted to ESPN.

2010s

Notes
 For the 2018 NL game, ESPN2 aired an alternate "Statcast Edition" broadcast featuring Jason Benetti on play-by-play and analysis from Eduardo Pérez and MLB.com writer Mike Petriello.
 For the 2019 AL game, ESPN2 aired an alternate "Statcast Edition" broadcast featuring Jason Benetti on play-by-play and analysis from Eduardo Pérez and MLB.com writer Mike Petriello.

Radio

2020s

Wild Card Series

Wild Card Game

2020 Wild Card Series

2010s

References

External links
Searchable Network TV Broadcasts
Your 2020 MLB Wild Card announcing schedule

+Wild Card Game
Wild Card Game
ESPN announcers
ESPN Radio
Turner Sports
ABC Sports